Yaqublu (also, Ashaga Yakublu and Yagublu) is a village and municipality in the Oghuz Rayon of Azerbaijan.  It has a population of 603.

References 

Populated places in Oghuz District